Talia Ryder (born August 16, 2002) is an American stage and film actress. In 2015, she had her breakout role as Hortensia in the Broadway musical Matilda the Musical. She made her feature film debut in 2020 as Skylar, opposite Sidney Flanigan, in the critically-acclaimed indie film Never Rarely Sometimes Always, which premiered at the Sundance Film Festival. She also starred as Tessa in Steven Spielberg's film adaptation of West Side Story. (2021). In 2021, she also had a starring role in Olivia Rodrigo's music video for "Deja Vu". In 2022, she starred as Clare in the Netflix film Hello, Goodbye, and Everything in Between and as Gabbi Broussard in the Netflix film Do Revenge.

Career
Ryder was 12 years old when she and her family went to see the Broadway production of Matilda the Musical, and she and her sister Mimi were inspired to audition for the show. She landed the role of Hortensia, and her family moved to New York City. Ryder has said that her background was mostly in dance, but she started developing her skills in stage acting.

In 2016, she was part of a cast of 75 kids in the short film Broadway Kids Against Bullying: I Have a Voice, directed by Jason Milstein, and its charity single composed by Frank Wildhorn, to support Nobully.org.

In 2019, she was cast as Autumn's cousin Skylar in the indie film Never Rarely Sometimes Always, where the two girls travel to New York City so that Autumn (Sidney Flanigan) can get an abortion without parental consent. Never Rarely Sometimes Always premiered at the Sundance Film Festival and was later released in the theatre and on video on demand shortly afterwards in March 2020.

In 2019, she was also cast as part of the Jets Chorus in Steven Spielberg's film adaptation of West Side Story.

Ryder had a starring role as Clare in the upcoming film Hello, Goodbye, and Everything in Between.

Ryder played Gabbi Broussard in the hit Netflix movie Do Revenge.

She had a starring role in Olivia Rodrigo's music video for "Deja Vu".

Ryder will star in upcoming film Joika  as Joy Womack.

Personal life 
Ryder's younger sister Mimi has a career as a musical actress with a title role in Matilda the Musical. She graduated from high school in 2020.

Filmography

Film

Music videos

Theater

Awards and nominations

References

External links
 

2002 births
Living people
American child actresses
21st-century American actresses
American musical theatre actresses
American film actresses
Actresses from Buffalo, New York